The 1893 Worcester Tech football team was an American football team that represented Worcester Polytechnic Institute in the 1893 college football season.

Schedule

References

Worcester Tech
WPI Engineers football seasons
Worcester Tech football